Henry Cho (born December 30, 1962) is an American stand-up comedian. His work can be heard nationwide several times weekly on SiriusXM Radio's Channel 98, Laugh USA, Sirius Radio's Jeff and Larry's Comedy Roundup Channel 97, and Pandora Radio's PG Comedy Radio Channel. Cho is notable for being one of the only Asian-American acts to appear regularly on the Grand Ole Opry and, on January 6, 2023, became the first Asian-American invited to become a member of the Opry.

Biography 
Cho, who is of Korean descent, was born and raised in Knoxville and went into stand-up comedy in 1986. He attended West High School, the University of Tennessee at Knoxville, and moved to Los Angeles, California in 1989 to pursue his career, but always with the intent of returning to his roots in Tennessee.

Cho often uses his childhood experiences as an Asian American in the South in his comedy. "I'm an Asian with a Southern accent," remarks Cho. "To a lot of people, that right there is funny."

In interviews, Cho has stated that he is a practicing Christian.

Career 
Cho appeared on many television shows in the late 1980s and early 1990s, including The Arsenio Hall Show, Bob Hope's Young Comedians Special, MTV's 1/2 Hour Comedy Hour, VH-1's Stand-Up Spotlight, and A&E's An Evening at the Improv. His other TV credits include guest roles on various sitcoms such as Designing Women, Lenny, The New WKRP in Cincinnati and a starring role in the TV movie Revenge of the Nerds III: The Next Generation. In 1994, after he moved back to Tennessee, Cho got a call from NBC to host a revamped version of Friday Night Videos titled Friday Night. For two years, he commuted to Los Angeles weekly. More recently he appeared on The Tonight Show with Jay Leno and The Late Late Show with Craig Ferguson. He was also the keynote speaker for the 59th Annual Radio and Television Correspondents' Dinner. Cho is well-known as a "clean" comedian, forgoing profanity and objectionable material, and has sometimes been referred to as "Mr. Clean".
 
He has appeared in three feature films. In 1997, he starred opposite Tom Arnold and David Alan Grier in McHale's Navy. In 2001, he appeared in the Farrelly Brothers' movie Say It Isn't So with Heather Graham and Chris Klein. Most recently, in 2006, he appeared in Material Girls starring Hilary and Haylie Duff.

During the holiday seasons of 2003 and 2004, Cho toured the U.S. with Amy Grant and Vince Gill, appearing live during the couple's show.

In 2006, he had his own Comedy Central special entitled Henry Cho: What's That Clickin' Noise? in which Jeff Foxworthy, Bill Engvall, and Larry the Cable Guy were special guest voices in the opening scene.

In 2007, he signed a deal with Touchstone Pictures and ABC to write, produce, and star in a television situation comedy series centered on Korean-Americans living in the South. In 2009 he signed a deal with CBS/Paramount to write, produce and star in another sitcom with Craig Ferguson as executive producer. In 2011 Henry had a special/pilot "The Henry Cho Show" on Great American Country (GAC).

Filmography 
 Designing Women (1989)
 Revenge of the Nerds III: The Next Generation (1992)
 Bandit: Beauty and the Bandit (1994)
 McHale's Navy (1997)
 Say It Isn't So (2001)
 Material Girls (2006)

Discography 

 What's That Clickin' Noise? (2006; Warner Brothers/Comedy Central)

References

External links 

"Comedy's Southern Squire", interview with Goldsea
"Face2Face with Henry Cho", 2009 interview with AsiaXpress.com

1962 births
American male film actors
American stand-up comedians
American television personalities
People from Knoxville, Tennessee
Living people
American male actors of Korean descent
20th-century American comedians
21st-century American comedians
Asian-American culture in Tennessee